Maliksi (also spelled Malicsi or Malixi) is a Tagalog-language surname. Notable people with the surname include:

Allein Maliksi (born 1987), Filipino basketball player
Ayong Maliksi (1938–2021), Filipino politician

Tagalog-language surnames